The 1950 FIBA World Championship, also called the 1st World Basketball Championship – 1950, was the inaugural edition of the World Cup basketball tournament held by the International Basketball Federation (FIBA). The tournament was held in Buenos Aires, Argentina, from 22 October to 3 November 1950. Ten nations participated in the inaugural tournament. All competition was held at the Luna Park, Buenos Aires. 

Argentina claimed the gold medal, by beating the United States 64–50 in the decisive game of the final round. After winning the tournament, Argentinian fans celebrated by burning newspapers which became known as the "Night of the Torches".

Host and venue
In the aftermath of World War II, Argentina was chosen as host of the inaugural World Cup partly because of its neutrality during the war.

Competing nations
FIBA determined the requirements to qualify for the World Championship as follows: the three best teams in the previous Olympic tournament (France, Brazil and the United States), the two best teams from South America (Uruguay and Chile, the top two teams in the 1949 South American Basketball Championship), Europe (Egypt, the winner of EuroBasket 1949) and Asia (South Korea), plus the host country (Argentina).

As South Korea withdrew due to travel difficulties, and Uruguay withdrew after being refused visas to enter Argentina, FIBA extended invitations to Ecuador, Yugoslavia, Spain and Peru.

Preliminary rounds

First phase

Egypt and Peru advance to the second preliminary phase.
Ecuador and Yugoslavia advance to the first repass round.

Second phase

Argentina, Brazil, Egypt and USA advance to the final round.
Chile and France advance to the first repass round
Peru and Spain advance to the second repass round.

Repass rounds

First phase

Chile and France advance to the second phase.
Ecuador and Yugoslavia are relegated to the classification round.

Second phase

Chile and France advance to the final round.
Peru and Spain are relegated to the classification round.

Classification round

Final round

Awards
Argentina won its first-ever World Cup, and Oscar Furlong was named the tournament's Most Valuable Player. Furlong averaged a team-high and 11.2 points during the tournament, fourth highest of all players.

All-Tournament Team

 Oscar Furlong (Argentina)
 John Stanich (USA)
 Rufino Bernedo (Chile)
 Álvaro Salvadores (Spain)
 Ricardo González (Argentina)

Final rankings

Team rosters 
Source: FIBA archive
Argentina: 8.Óscar Furlong, 11.Ricardo González, 3.Pedro Bustos, 5.Leopoldo Contarbio, 4.Hugo del Vecchio, 7.Vito Liva, 14.Alberto López, 10.Rubén Menini, 13.Omar Monza, 6.Raúl Pérez Varela, 12.Juan Carlos Uder, 9.Roberto Viau (Coach: Jorge Hugo Canavesi – Casimiro González Trilla])
USA: 20.John Stanich, 66.Bob Fisher, 75.Bryce Heffley, 55.Thomas Jaquet, 33.Dan Kahler, 19.John Langdon, 40.Les Metzger, 44.J. L. Parks, 22.Jimmy Reese, 16.Don Slocum, 77.Blake Williams (Coach: Gordon Carpenter)
Chile: Rufino Bernedo, Pedro Araya,  Eduardo Cordero, Mariano Fernández,  Exequiel Figueroa, Juan José Gallo, Raúl López, Luis Enrique Marmentini, Juan Ostoic, Hernán Ramos, Marcos Sánchez, Víctor Mahana (Coach: Kenneth Davidson)
Brazil: 45.Zenny de Azevedo "Algodão", 46.Ruy de Freitas, 44.Alfredo da Motta, 48.Paulo Rodrigues Siqueira "Montanha", 42.Hélio Marques Pereira "Godinho", 46.Celso dos Santos, 47.Plutão de Macedo, 49.Sebastião Amorim Gimenez "Tiao", 50.Thales Monteiro, 51.Alexandre Gemignani, Milton Santos Marques "Miltinho", 53.Ângelo Bonfietti "Angelim" (Coach: Moacyr Brondi Daiuto)

All-Tournament Team

Top scorers

  Álvaro Salvadores (Spain) 13.8
  Fortunato Muñoz (Ecuador) 13.2
  Alfredo Arroyave (Ecuador) 11.4
  Óscar Furlong (Argentina) 11.2
  Rufino Bernedo (Chile) 10.8
  Ricardo González (Argentina) 10.7
  Eduardo Kucharski González (Spain) 9.8
  Hussein Kamel Montasser (Egypt) 8.8
  Eduardo Fiestas (Peru) 8.7
  Alberto Fernández (Peru) 8.2

References

External links 

 
 
 Results
 WC 1950 on FIBA.com

 
FIBA Basketball World Cup
B
 Sports competitions in Buenos Aires
Fiba World Championship, 1950